Ika may refer to:

Ika, Akwa Ibom, a Local Government Area in Nigeria
Ika, Croatia, a town in Primorje-Gorski Kotar County, Croatia
Ika language (Colombia), also known as Arhuaco
Ika language (Nigeria)
Ika people, of Nigeria
Ika people (Colombia)
Enrique Ika (c. 1859–after 1900), king of Easter Island
Tehran Imam Khomeini International Airport, Tehran, Iran
Ika Musume, the main character from the Japanese manga Squid Girl

See also
IKA (disambiguation)
ICA (disambiguation)

Language and nationality disambiguation pages